In mathematics, Banach algebra cohomology of a Banach algebra with coefficients in a bimodule is a cohomology theory defined in a similar way to Hochschild cohomology of an abstract algebra, except that one takes the topology into account so that all cochains and so on are continuous.

References 
 
 
 

Homological algebra
Banach algebras